Strange Dance is the third studio album by the English musician Philip Selway. It was released on 24 February 2023 via Bella Union. It comes almost nine years after Selway's previous studio album, Weatherhouse, not including Selway’s composition of the soundtrack to the film Let Me Go in 2017. The album received generally positive reviews.

Content 
Selway described his vision for the project as "a Carole King record if she collaborated with the pioneering electronic composer Daphne Oram and invited him to drum on it". Contributors include Marta Salogni, who also produced the album, and Hannah Peel, Adrian Utley of Portishead and Quinta. Selway chose not to drum on the album, finding he was out of practice and "not in the right mindset", and enlisted the Italian drummer Valentina Magaletti.

The album cover features a piece by the abstract painter Stewart Geddes.

Release 
"Check for Signs of Life" was released as the first single on 25 October 2022, followed by "Picking Up Pieces" on 9 January 2023, and “Strange Dance” on 8 February 2023. Strange Dance was released on 24 February 2023 via Bella Union.

Alongside the standard release, the album will receive a deluxe edition for vinyl containing a second LP called Liminal, consisting of pieces Selway composed for the film Carmilla and the BBC Radio 3 play Sea Longing, alongside additional prints by Geddes.

Track listing

Charts

References

2023 albums
Philip Selway albums